Arthur Boucher (29 June 1870 – 25 April 1948) was a Welsh international rugby union forward who played club rugby for Newport. Boucher was an adaptable player, who although selected mainly as a forward, often played at centre. He was strong, quick for his position and passed well on the run. He was often noted for his kicking skills and kicked several drop goals each season even as a forward. Boucher was one of the last great all-round Welsh players before positional specialisation was adopted. Boucher played for the invitational Barbarians and became their club secretary between 1894 and 1899. He is the maternal grandfather of Dick King-Smith.

Rugby career
Born in Gobowen in England, Boucher moved to Wales while still young. He joined Newport during the 1889/90 season and in the following decade he captained them over three seasons. Boucher was part of Newport's invincible 1891/92 season alongside the legendary Arthur Gould, though Boucher actually played more games.

Boucher was first selected to play for Wales on 2 January 1892 against England. He was brought in with fellow Newport forward Wallace Watts, and the two were selected to play in the same squad on ten occasions. The Welsh team were beaten soundly by England, and failed to win any of the games in that season's Championship. The next season Boucher played his role in winning Wales's very first Triple Crown, and by 1897 he had collected 13 caps, missing two games in between only due to injuries. In his final game for Wales against England, Boucher scored his first and only try for his country, and due to the Gould Affair Wales played no further games that season.

International matches played
Wales
  1892, 1893, 1894, 1895, 1896, 1897
  1892, 1893, 1895, 1896
  1892, 1893, 1895

Bibliography

References

1870 births
1948 deaths
Wales international rugby union players
English rugby union players
Rugby union forwards
Newport RFC players
Barbarian F.C. players
Rugby union players from Shropshire